Global Industrial is a business unit of Systemax Inc, a Fortune 1000 company, listed on the New York Stock Exchange as . Global Industrial is incorporated in New York as Global Equipment Company Inc., and conducts business under the names Global Industrial, Global Industrial Equipment, Globalindustrial.ca and GlobalIndustrial.com. The company sells industrial products and office supplies through direct to business channels with headquarters in Port Washington, New York.

History 

Global Industrial was established in 1949 by Michael and Paul Leeds in Queens, New York as a material handling equipment supplier. In 1985 the company began to deal with computer products. Through acquisitions of other computer-supply companies, the company expanded across the U.S. and into parts of Europe, with a revenue of nearly $180 million by 1990.

According to the company website, it sells over 1,000,000 products via online sales and call center.

According to Systemax annual reports and web articles the company has seen double digit growth for the past 5 years.

Awards and honors

Global Industrial has been accredited by the Better Business Bureau since June 2002.

Global Industrial was ranked number 21 on Modern Distribution Management's Top 40 Industrial Distributors in 2017.

References

External links 
 Global Industrial
 Global Industrial Canada

Industrial supply companies
Companies based in Nassau County, New York
Business services companies established in 1949
1949 establishments in New York City
Retail companies of the United States